The Calizas de Lychnus Formation is a Maastrichtian geologic formation in northern central Spain. Dinosaur remains diagnostic to the genus level are among the fossils that have been recovered from the formation.

Fossil content

Dinosaurs 
 cf. Euronychodon sp.
 cf. Paranoychodon sp. (?Troodontidae indet.)
 ?Hypselosaurus sp.
 Nodosauridae indet.
 Rhabdodontidae indet.
 Titanosauridae indet.
 Dinosauria indet.
 Sauropoda indet.
 ?Dromaeosauridae indet.

Invertebrates
 Bithynella sp.
 Physa cf. patula

Fish
 Actinopterygii indet.

Other reptiles
 Acynodon lopezi
 Crocodylia indet.
 Eusuchia indet.
 Testudines indet.

Mammals
 Labes quintanillensis
 ?Palaeoryctidae indet.

Flora
 Typha sp.
 Arecaceae indet.
 Charophyta indet.

See also 
 List of dinosaur-bearing rock formations
 List of stratigraphic units with few dinosaur genera

References

Bibliography 
 Weishampel, David B.; Dodson, Peter; and Osmólska, Halszka (eds.): The Dinosauria, 2nd, Berkeley: University of California Press. 861 pp. 
 C. Pol, A. D. Buscalioni, J. Carballeira, V. Francés, N. López Martínez, B. Marandat, J. J. Moratalla, J. L. Sanz, B. Sigé and J. Villatte. 1992. Reptiles and mammals from the Late Cretaceous new locality Quintanilla del Coco (Burgos Province, Spain). Neues Jahrbuch für Geologie und Paläontologie - Abhandlungen 184(3):279-314
 J. L. Sanz, A. D. Buscalioni, J. J. Moratalla, V. Francés, and M. Antón. 1990. Los reptiles Mesozoicos del registro español [The Mesozoic reptiles from the Spanish record]. Monografias del Museo Nacional de Ciencias Naturales 2:1-79

Geologic formations of Spain
Upper Cretaceous Series of Europe
Cretaceous Spain
Maastrichtian Stage
Limestone formations
Mudstone formations
Lacustrine deposits
Paleontology in Spain